Milan Simeunović (born 14 May 1967) is a Serbian former professional footballer who played as a goalkeeper.

Career
Simeunović played for Borac Čačak in the 1989–90 Yugoslav Second League, Sloboda Užice in the 1990–91 Yugoslav Second League, and Borac Banja Luka in the 1991–92 Yugoslav First League. He won the 1992 Mitropa Cup with the latter side. In the summer of 1992, Simeunović was transferred to Red Star Belgrade. He spent the next four seasons with the club and won four major trophies.

In the summer of 1996, Simeunović moved abroad to Belgian club Standard Liège. He later played for two Swedish clubs (IK Brage and Malmö FF) and two Danish clubs (Viborg FF and Silkeborg IF).

Honours
Borac Banja Luka
 Mitropa Cup: 1992
Red Star Belgrade
 First League of FR Yugoslavia: 1994–95
 FR Yugoslavia Cup: 1992–93, 1994–95, 1995–96

References

External links
 

Allsvenskan players
Association football goalkeepers
Belgian Pro League players
Danish Superliga players
Expatriate footballers in Belgium
Expatriate men's footballers in Denmark
Expatriate footballers in Sweden
First League of Serbia and Montenegro players
FK Borac Banja Luka players
FK Borac Čačak players
FK Sloboda Užice players
IK Brage players
Malmö FF players
Red Star Belgrade footballers
Serbia and Montenegro expatriate footballers
Serbia and Montenegro expatriate sportspeople in Belgium
Serbia and Montenegro expatriate sportspeople in Sweden
Serbia and Montenegro footballers
Serbian footballers
Silkeborg IF players
Standard Liège players
Viborg FF players
Yugoslav First League players
Yugoslav footballers
1967 births
Living people